The Battle of Kliszów (also spelled Klissow or Klezow) took place on July 19, 1702, near Kliszów in the Polish–Lithuanian Commonwealth during the Great Northern War. A numerically superior Polish–Saxon army led by king Augustus II the Strong was defeated by a Swedish army half its size under the command of king Charles XII of Sweden.

During the second year of the war, following the Swedish victories at Narva and Düna, Charles XII launched a campaign against the Polish-Lithuanian Commonwealth. His aim was to outmaneuver Augustus II's Saxon troops and create dissension in the Polish–Lithuanian Commonwealth to depose Augustus II as king of Poland. In May 1702, Charles XII captured the capital of Warsaw. While there, the Swedish king received intelligence about Augustus II being in Kraków and assembling a large Saxon army. He chose to pursue Augustus II and called for Swedish reinforcements in order to assemble an army capable of defeating the Saxon army in a decisive battle. He left Warsaw in the middle of June, and by the beginning of July, the armies of the two kings were within a few miles of each other south of Kielce. After minor skirmishes and with the arrival of his reinforcements, Charles XII was ready to attack Augustus II's army, which had taken up a strong defensive position at the village of Kliszów.

On the afternoon of 9 July, the Swedish army carried out a left-turn movement in an attempt of encircling the Saxon right wing. While this was happening, the Polish Crown Army arrived to assist Augustus II, who threatened to perform a pincer movement against both the Swedish left wing and the rest of the Swedish army. Facing this imminent threat, Charles XII ordered to reinforce the Swedish left wing with infantry battalions from the Swedish center. The Swedish wings managed to withstand the Saxon–Polish cavalry attacks, after which the Saxon–Polish cavalry were driven from the battlefield. The Swedish cavalry and infantry were then able to jointly attack the Saxon infantry, which was forced to retreat after a fierce battle. The Saxon–Polish losses after the battle were estimated at 4,400 men, while the Swedish losses amounted to 1,100 men.

Augustus II retreated after the battle to Sandomierz, with large parts of his army intact and still in control of large parts of Poland. However, his military power over the Commonwealth, including the Polish unity, became greatly weakened following the battle. Despite failing to achieve a decisive victory against Augustus II, the battle still ended up a tactical and political victory for Charles XII.

Background

Context

On February 12, 1700, the Great Northern War began when Augustus II the Strong, king of Poland and elector of Saxony, and his Saxon troops crossed the Düna river and laid siege to the city of Riga in Swedish Livonia. Meanwhile, the Danish army under king Frederick IV of Denmark invaded the Swedish allied duchies of Holstein and Gottorp in order to secure his rear, before commencing with the planned invasion of Scania. In September 1700, Russian forces under Tsar Peter I invaded Swedish Ingria and began a siege of Narva in Swedish Estonia. These three nations had secretly agreed on a joint pact to attack the Swedish Empire from three separate fronts, and each had the aim of winning back territories which they had lost to Sweden during previous wars. The Swedish Army under the command of king Charles XII of Sweden first repelled the Danish threat. Through a successful Swedish landing operation at Humlebæk on Zealand, on 25 July 1700, Frederick IV was forced to withdraw from the war on 8 August of the same year by signing the Peace of Travendal. Later on 20 November, the Russians was forced to withdraw back to Russia after their crushing defeat against Charles XII's main army at the battle of Narva.

On his march towards Riga, Charles XII defeated a Saxon–Russian army at the battle of Düna on 9 July 1701. The majority of the Saxon–Russian troops under Field marshal Adam Heinrich von Steinau withdrew from the battle in a relatively orderly fashion, leaving Charles XII unable to completely defeat Augustus II. The Swedish army later crossed the Düna and occupied the Duchy of Courland. Charles XII then decided to launch a military campaign in Poland, in order to outmaneuver Augustus II's troops and depose him as king of Poland, before moving on against Russia. Several of the king's advisors, including Polish magnates and foreign diplomats, were worried about the king's war plans, especially regarding his plan to depose Augustus II. The Polish–Lithuanian Commonwealth was still neutral in the conflict, since Augustus II had attacked Swedish Livonia in his capacity as elector of Saxony and not as king of Poland.

Swedish invasion of Poland

At the beginning of February 1702, Charles XII marched into Lithuania with 14,000 men. He left 25,000 men in Swedens Baltic dominions, which were distributed to different garrisons without a common leadership, and another 4,000 men under Major General Carl Magnus Stuart in Courland. On March 29, 1702, Charles XII left Lithuania and marched with the main army towards Warsaw. Both Augustus II and the main representative of the Commonwealth, cardinal primate Michał Stefan Radziejowski, left the capital, leaving Charles XII unopposed in conquering the city on 14 May. There he made unsuccessful negotiation talks with various Polish noble factions who were in opposition to Augustus II. He then received intelligence that Augustus II had fled to Kraków, where he gathered his Saxon troops. On May 24, he sent orders to General Nils Gyllenstierna in Swedish Pomerania to immediately advance with 10,000 men towards Kraków. On June 2, he gave orders to Major Generals Carl Mörner and Magnus Stenbock with their 4,000 men from Vilnius in Lithuania, as well as to Major General Georg Johan Maidel with his troops in Courland, to return to the main Swedish army. However, Maidel reported that he were unable to move his troops until 17 June and was therefore far away from Charles XII's army. The king received a similar report from Gyllenstierna, who's troops remained in Stettin, whereupon the king decided not to wait for him in Warsaw.

On June 16, Charles XII marched out of Warsaw with four cavalry regiments and four infantry regiments, totaling 8,000 men, leaving a few thousand men to form a garrison in the city. During the march, the king dispatched Lieutenant Colonel Axel Gyllenkrok with 500 cavalry and 300 infantry to collect supplies for the maintenance of the main Swedish army. He also sent repeated messages to Mörner that his troops should immediately cross the Weichsel river and reunite with him. On the same day of his departure from Warsaw, the king encamped at Tarczyn on the road to Kraków. He then continued on through Grójec and Łęczeszyce and camped for a few days in Nowe Miasto nad Pilicą. The march then continued via Drzewica and Gowarczów to Radoszyce, where they camped for a few days. On 1 July, Charles XII received a report from Gyllenkrok that he was having difficulty in providing sufficient supplies. The king chose to move his army west towards the city of Kielce in Lesser Poland. There his troops would be well supplied and where he could make easier contact with Mörner's and Stenbock's troops. The latter arrived at Lublin on June 26, after which they crossed the Weichsel at Kazimierz Dolny on June 29. At Wierzbica, on 5 July, Mörner and Stenbock had an unexpected meeting with Charles XII, who from Kielce made a  ride in just two days to give them oral instructions on the direction of march to his camp. The king then returned to his troops on 6 July, and ordered them to withdraw to the south.

Augustus II received intelligence of Charles XII's approach and was urged by Lieutenant General Jacob Heinrich von Flemming to march north with a large army and defeat Charles XII before he could unite with Gyllenstierna's troops. On the news of Gyllenstierna's decampment from Stettin, Augustus II marched out of Kraków on July 2 with a Saxon army of 15,000 men. Later on July 8, he received word that the Crown Army under Hetman Hieronim Augustyn Lubomirski was on the marsch and was only  from Kliszów.

Prelude

On the way there, Meijerfeldt was ambushed by a cavalry force of 200 Cossacks and Wallachians in a forest near Obice. 30 Swedish dragoons under Captain Tomas Funck repulsed their attack, with the latter retreating with heavy casualties. Meijerfeldt returned to Charles XII on 5 July and made a report on the incident. The king contemplated on launching a surprise attack against Augustus II on the morning of July 8. But on the advice of lieutenant general Carl Gustav Rehnskiöld, he decided to wait another day for Mörner's and Stenbock's troops to arrive at his camp.

On the morning of July 8, ryttmästare Carl Gustaf Örnestedt's outposts near the army's field camp at Obice were attacked by 200 Saxon soldiers and about a hundred Wallachians under Major General von Brause, who was ordered by Augustus II to gather intelligence about the Swedes' location. Örnestedt managed to repel the attack and the Saxons' losses amounted to about twenty killed or wounded and between 8 and 9 captured. Among the Swedes, ryttmästare Gustaf Fägerskiöld died along with some horsemen. After receiving the alarm report, the king immediately went there to with his own eyes reconnoitre the previous skirmish. In the evening of the same day, Mörner's and Stenbock's troops finally arrived at the royal camp, ending their five-week long expedition from Vilnius. Their troops were largely exhausted, several men were sick, and their horses were starved as a result of their forced marches. The troops got a few hours of sleep before they were ordered to line up the following morning.

On the morning of July 9, on the anniversary of the battle of Düna, a false rumor spread around the Swedish camp that the Saxon army were on the move. At six o'clock in the morning, Charles XII ordered his troops to carry out a mass and issue the battle cry "With God's help". Then the troops were ordered to march out and divide themselves into four marching columns. They moved southwards towards Kliszów under the cover of a large forest and intermediate heights. Steps were taken to give the impression that it was only a small reconnaissance force and not the whole army that was on the march, and the troops were ordered to march with lowered weapons and banners. Saxon reconnaissance patrols at the western edge of the forest caught sight of some Swedish units, but they got the idea that these were part of the rearguard who masked a large Swedish retreat. When the Swedes arrived on a field outside of the southern edge of the forest, Charles XII caught sight of the Saxon positions near Kliszów. He then wheeled right and arranged his troops in order of battle. At ten o'clock, the Saxon troops caught sight of Charles XII's army. Augustus II sounded the alarm with two cannon shots and prepared his troops for battle.

Battlefield
Small villages surrounded the battlefield, including Rebów in the west, followed by Kliszów, Kokot in the south, Kije, Lipnik, Wymoslów in the east, Górki, Wierzbica and Borczyn in the north. The Swedes had their field camp at Obice north of their later rallying point at Borczyn, both of which were separated by a large forest that the Swedes used to cover their advance. The Saxon camp stretched just east of Kliszów. The Nida river flowed through a large swamp just west of Kliszów. The Hajdaszek Forest stretched south of both Kliszów and Kokot. The Saxon army used both the river and the forest as flank protection. It's front was protected by a marshy stream that ran from the Nida. The Saxons had dug both trenches and moats around the height, and placed their artillery on the top of it and chevaux de frise on its slopes. The Saxon center stood between the artillery and the camp. The left wing was placed on a ridge behind Rebów, while the right wing was placed in front of Kokot facing northeast.

Order of battle

Swedish army
The Swedish army in the battle had an official strength of 16,230 men with 4 four–pounder regimental guns, but in reality only between 10,000 and 12,000 men were fit for combat, due to famine, disease and exhaustion. The fighting force consisted of 8,000 infantry distributed between 18 infantry battalions, and 25 cavalry squadrons and 12 dragoon squadrons totaling 4,000 men. The troops were arrayed in two lines in front of Borczyn, with the infantry in the center and cavalry on both wings. The first line consisted of 25 squadrons and 12 battalions; the second line of 15 squadrons and 6 battalions.

Charles XII took command of the Swedish right cavalry wing, with Lieutenant General Rehnskiöld as his second-in-command. The first line was under the command of Major General Mörner and the second line under Lieutenant General Jakob Spens. The right wing was made up of 21 squadrons, consisting of the Drabant Corps squadron under Major General Arvid Horn, the Life Regiment on Horse, with 7 squadrons on the first line under Major Carl Gustaf Creutz and 3 squadrons on the second line under ryttmästare Peter Wetzler, the Life Dragoon Regiment's 3 squadrons under Colonel Hugo Johan Hamilton and Östergötland Cavalry Regiment, with 4 squadrons on the first line under Lieutenant Colonel Jacob Burensköld and 4 squadrons on the second line under Major Starkenfelt. The Swedish left cavalry wing was under the command of Frederick IV, Duke of Holstein-Gottorp, with cavalry general Otto Vellingk as his second-in-command. The wing consisted of 19 squadrons from the Life Regiment on Horse, the Life Dragoon Regiment, the Southern Scanian Cavalry Regiment, with 6 squadrons on the first line under Lieutenant Colonel Johan Ridderschantz and 2 squadrons on the second line under Major Mörner, and the Småland Cavalry Regiment, with 3 squadrons on the first line under Lieutenant Colonel Johan Stålhammar and 5 squadrons on the second line under Major Mörner. Major General Alexander Stromberg was in charge of the first line and Major General Carl Nieroth was in charge of the second.

The Swedish center's 17 battalions consisted of the Svea Life Guards's 4 battalions under Major General Knut Posse, the Dalarna Regiment's 2 battalions under Lieutenant Colonel Gustaf Henrik von Siegroth and Captain Carl Svinhufvud, the Kalmar Regiment's 2 battalions under Colonel Gustaf Ranck and Lieutenant Colonel Erik Silfversparre, the Närke-Värmland Regiment's 2 battalions under Colonel Carl Gustaf Roos and Lieutenant Colonel Johan Cronman, the Uppland Regiment's 2 battalions under Lieutenant Colonel von Holst and Major Carl Ludvig von Post, the Västerbotten Regiment's 2 battalions under Colonel Reinhold Johan von Fersen and Major Lars Björnhufvud and the Västmanland Regiment's 2 battalions under Colonel Axel Sparre and Lieutenant Colonel Mathias Fredrik von Feilitzen, and 1 battalion from the Östergötland Reserve Infantry Regiment under Lieutenant Colonel Claes Ekeblad. The center was commanded by Lieutenant General Bernhard von Liewen, with Major General Stenbock in charge of the first line and Major General Posse in charge of the second line. The Swedish baggage train was protected by 100 dragoons from Henrik Otto von Albedyl's Dragoon Regiment under Major Johan Reinhold von Trautvetter and a battalion from Uppland Reserve Infantry Regiment under Nils Hammarhjelm.

Saxon–Polish army
The Saxon army in the battle had an official strength of 22,230 men, with an effective fighting strength totaling 16,500 men. The fighting force consisted of 7,145 infantry distributed between 16 battalions, and 44 cavalry squadrons and 24 dragoon squadrons totaling 9,000 men. The Saxons had 46 artillery pieces operated by 355 artillerymen, about half of which were heavy 12-pounder guns and the rest were 4-pounder regimental guns. The Saxon–Polish army thus had a numerical superiority in both the number of cannons and cavalry. The army was under the command of Augustus II. The Saxon left wing was under Field marshal Steinau, with Danish Major General Adam Fredrik von Trampe in charge of the first line and Major General Francuz de Plessis in charge of the second line. The center was under Lieutenant General Johann Matthias von der Schulenburg, supported by Major Generals Denhoff, Venediger and Ostromirski. The right wing was under Lieutenant General Flemming, with Major General Marschewitz in charge of the first line and Major General von Beust in charge of the second line. The Crown Army under the command of Hetman Lubomirski was also placed on the right wing.

The Saxon center's 16 battalions were formed on the first line by the 4 battalions of the Saxon and Polish Guards under Stanisław Ernest Denhoff, 2 battalions of the Elector's Regiment, 2 battalions of Wolf Dietrich von Beichlingen's Regiment and 2 battalions of the Queen's Regiment, while on the second line by 2 battalions of Steinau's Regiment, Görtz regiment's 2 battalions and Pistori's regiment's 2 battalions. The right cavalry wing consisted of about 3,000 men, made up of the Life Guard on Horse's 10 squadrons, the Life Dragoon Regiment's 6 squadrons, the Joachim R. Goltz Dragoon Regiment's 6 squadrons, the Elector's Cuirassier Regiment's 6 squadrons and the Eichstädt Cuirassier Regiment's 6 squadrons. The left cavalry wing consisted of about 4,000 men, and consisted of Steinau's Cuirassier Regiment's 6 squadrons, Carl G. Jordan's Cuirassier Regiment's 6 squadrons, the Queen's Cuirassier Regiment's 6 squadrons, the Horse Life Guard's 4 squadrons, Milkau's Dragoon Regiment's 6 squadrons and the Crown Prince's Dragoon Regiment's 6 squadrons.

The Polish Crown Army had an official paperstrength of about 12,000 men. However, at least a third of these were civilians and not combat personnel, making the total number between 6,000 and 8,000 men, mainly cavalry. The Polish fighting force consisted of between 1,350 and 1,450 winged hussars, between 4,000 and 4,200 cavalry, between 560 and 600 infantry and 159 artillerymen. The Polish cavalry thus consisted of around 5,900 to 6,200 men. Together with the Polish infantry and artillery (between 4 and 5 guns), the Crown Army consisted of between 6,500 and 6,800 men. It was divided between 11 cavalry regiments and 109 squadrons: King Augustus II's Cavalry Regiment's 9 squadrons, Prince August's Cavalry Regiment's 9 squadrons, Lubomirski's Cavalry Regiment's 9 squadrons, Adam Mikołaj Sieniawski's Cavalry Regiment's 9 squadrons, Karol Stanisław Radziwiłł's Cavalry Regiment's 9 squadrons, Marcin Kątski's Cavalry Regiment's 9 squadrons, Rafał Leszczyński's Cavalry Regiment's 9 squadrons, Jerzy Dominik Lubomirski's Cavalry Regiment's 8 squadrons, Atanazy Miączyński's Cavalry Regiment's 9 squadrons, Stefan Aleksander Potocki's Cavalry Regiment's 9 squadrons, Jan Sobieski's Cavalry Regiment's 9 squadrons, and the Wallachian Cavalry Regiment's 13 squadrons. The Polish infantry consisted of Lubomirski's Hungarian Infantry Regiment and mercenaries under the command of Marcin Kątski, General of Artillery. The first line consisted of 12 squadrons or 2,600 cavalry under Lubomirski's command, while the second line of 14 squadrons or 3,000 men under Hetman Sieniawski. The Polish guns and infantry was placed in the middle of the both cavalry lines.

Battle

Charles XII's initial intention was to carry out a frontal assault against the Saxon infantry on the Kulaki Height. But a reconnaissance of the marshy wetlands in front of the Saxons' advantageous position indicated that it would be very difficult to perform such a maneuver. Therefore, in order to bypass the morass, he decided to wheel the entire Swedish army to the left. The army was to march up the slope near the village of Wierzbica, which they would use as a starting point in both their attack and their attempt to encircle the Saxon right wing. The Saxons intended to attack the Swedes from two sides during their approach. The left wing was to cross Rebów to attack the Swedish right wing, while the Saxon infantry would advance northwards towards Borczyn. The right wing would face the Swedish encirclement. Shortly thereafter, an unpleasant surprise appeared to the Swedish army. The Crown army suddenly appeared beyond the village of Kije, positioning themselves next to the Saxon right wing. The ongoing Swedish wheeling maneuver would now become vulnerable to a Saxon–Polish pincer maneuver, with their combined troops now comprising about 9,000 cavalry against only 2,000 within the Swedish left wing.

This sudden development forced Charles XII to halt his troops, transfer the command of the Swedish right wing to Rehnskiöld, and relocate himself to the weak Swedish left wing. There he personally organized a cavalry front that would confront the Crown army, and called for infantry support from the Swedish center that would protect the left wing from inevitable Polish cavalry attacks. Under Stenbock's command, the Swedish infantry was regrouped and nine battalions from the Dalarna, Kalmar, Närke-Värmland, Uppland and Västmanland regiments rushed into the widened gaps between the squadrons in the left wing. The king also ordered the Västerbotten Regiment and Uppland Reserve Regiment to move in between the gaps in the Swedish right wing. At the same time, the Crown army managed to squeeze in and obscure the view of the Saxon right wing south of Kokot, causing the Saxons to not having enough room to launch their own attack. The Swedish regimental guns returned fire.

The reinforced Swedish left wing sought to confront the expected Polish attack. Shortly before two o'clock in the afternoon, the left cavalry wing under duke Frederick IV advanced against the Crown army. Already at the beginning of the march, however, the duke was hit in the lower back by a Saxon falconet shot, and the advance halted. The duke was escorted to a nearby oak grove and died there a few hours later. The command of the entire left wing was transferred to Vellingk. The Swedish cavalry were forced to give way to 600 winged hussars, who immediately charged towards the Swedish battalions lined up on the gaps between the Swedish squadrons.

Following the second volley fired by the Swedish musketeers, while also being daunted by the Swedish pikemen, the Polish cavalry charges were quickly repulsed. Later, the Småland and Scanian cavalry regiments made a countercharge, causing Lubomirski's Polish cavalry to quickly collapse. Due to the lack of coordination and trust between the Polish-Saxon units, Lubomirski chose to withdraw from the battlefield along with the Crown army. The Swedish cavalry chased the Poles all the way to Kije, before they were ordered to break off from the pursuit. Meanwhile, the crowded Saxon right wing tried to expand their ground by attacking Vellingk's reinforced left wing. The point of impact, however, was against three battalions from the Uppland, Närke-Värmland and Västerbotten regiments from the Swedish center. Commanding four Scanian squadrons, Vellingk attacked the Saxon dragoons both frontally and in the flank. The attack was then completed by a Värmland battalion. In less than an hour, the Saxon right wing was forced into a wild retreat. The communication to the rear of the Saxon army was practically cut off. During the fighting, Flemming received two wounds and a horse shot under him.

By two o'clock in the afternoon, parallel to the engagements against the Swedish left wing, the Saxon left wing under Steinau had crossed the morass by fascine bridges at Rebów and rapidly advanced towards Rehnskiöld's troops. While these were occupied with regrouping their ranks, Steinau attempted to cut Rehnskiöld's troops off from the Swedish center. Steinau and Trampe made a flanking maneuver and attacked Rehnskiöld in the front, flank and rear. With 34 Saxon squadrons against 21 Swedish, each with roughly 125 Saxons against 100 Swedish, the Saxons enjoyed their numerical advantage. Observing the danger, Rehnskiöld quickly sent Adjutant General Gustaf Adam Taube to Charles XII across the battlefield with a request for help. The king, however, rejected Rehnskiöld's request and urged him to hold his ground on his own.

Rehnskiöld was therefore forced to completely reorganize his troops, ordering the Västerbotten Regiment, the Uppland Reserve Regiment and the squadrons of the Life Regiment on Horse to form square formations in order to face the Saxon attack from multiple directions. The ensuing battle was both fierce and bloody. The Saxons fired a volley that caused heavy casualties among the Life Regiment on Horse in the front rank. These were supported by the Drabant Corps, who quickly repulsed the first Saxon attack. Rehnskiöld's cavalry then made a countercharge that penetrated several Saxon units. Steinau regrouped his units and performed a new attack against the Swedes east of Rebów, but was again forced to withdraw. With great difficulty, several Saxon cavalry regiments managed to reach safety on the west bank of the Nida, while other units were pushed into the morass and drowned. A small body of Saxon cavalry occupied an adjacent height from which they attacked the Swedish cavalry trying to cross the morass. After a furious charge from the Drabant Corps, these were also forced to retreat.

Later in the afternoon, the Saxon infantry on the Kulaki Height were still intact, with their location being used as a rallying point for scattered Saxon cavalry divisions. At three o'clock, the Swedes carried out a series of coordinated attacks against the Kulaki Height: Rehnskiöld attacked from the west, Posse from the north and Charles XII and Vellingk from the east. Furthermore, the cavalry engagements during the early afternoon accumulated large clouds of dust and gunpowder smoke that drifted towards the height with south-easterly winds, which greatly obstructed the aim of the Saxon artillery. Using the clouds as a smoke screen, eight battalions from the Swedish center, consisting of the Svea Life Guards, the Uppland Regiment, the Västerbotten Regiment and the Östergötland Reserve Regiment, marched along the narrow passages across the marshy stream in front of the height. They then rushed past the chevaux de frise up the slopes of the height under fierce artillery fire, and made a furious charge against the Saxon infantry. Their attack came at the cost of the Life Guards to account for the majority of the Swedish losses in the entire battle. When the Swedes finally captured the Saxon light regimental artillery, they aimed the guns at the Saxons to good effect. At this stage, Steinau's regiment was forced to lay down their arms.

Meanwhile, Lieutenant General Schulenburg managed to rally a significant amount of the retreating Saxon regiments to a new position on the Kulaki Height. But at half past four, due to heavy enemy pressure from all sides, Augustus II decided to fall back towards the Hajdaszek Forest. After a quick recovery, they would continue their retreat through Pinczów and on to the road towards Kraków. Augustus II took command of some remaining squadrons who would guide the retreat and assigned a rearguard to cover his retreat. Squadrons of the Swedish left wing blocked the road to Pinczów at four o'clock, and the last remnants of Augustus II's army were chased away or captured in the former Saxon field camp. Many Saxon soldiers fell and drowned in the swamps behind Kliszów and Rebów, while Swedish musketeers fired at them "like wild animals stuck in a net". At half past five in the afternoon, Charles XII recalled his troops from the field of battle to regroup in the newly conquered Saxon field camp. Between five and six o'clock in the afternoon, the king ordered his musicians to "play songs of victory with fiddles and trumpets", and a mass was held.

Casualties

Swedish army
The Swedes had 300 men killed and between 500 and 900 wounded, with 800 wounded being the widely accepted number. According to other sources, as many as 1,000 Swedies were killed during the battle. Among the fallen were Duke Frederick IV and lieutenant colonel Ridderschantz, five captains, five ryttmästare, five lieutenants, two ensigns, two regimental quartermasters and a corporal. Among the wounded were Major Generals Posse, Horn and Spens, Lieutenant Colonel Stålhammar, one ryttmästare, three majors, two captains, three ensigns and two non-commissioned officers. The Svea Life Guard's losses amounted to 337 privates and 34 officers in both killed and wounded. Furthermore, 849 cavalry horses were killed, two men had been captured, one of them being an officer. One standard was also lost.

The following day, Charles XII ordered the fallen Swedish privates and officers to be buried with all honors. He also gave his troops permission to plunder the Saxon wagons scattered around the morass. Furthermore, he gave orders that every wounded officer and non-commissioned officer of the Drabant Corps and the Life Guards should be given a quarter of a jug of wine and two jugs of beer a day, which they would be provided for the next few days.

Saxon–Polish army
The combined Saxon–Polish army had around 2,000 men killed on the battlefield, more precisely about 1,800 men according to some sources. More men were killed during the retreat but their number is unknown. According to Saxon relations, the Saxon army had sustained 1,706 men killed and 231 officers and privates wounded. The Polish Crown Army had sustained about 80 men killed, including 60 winged hussars. In total, around 1,500 Saxons and Poles were wounded, including Field marshal Steinau, Lieutenant General Flemming and Major General Trampe.

The Saxon infantry lost about 1,000 men. The Saxon cavalry suffered 828 men, of which 42 officers and 594 privates killed and 35 officers and 157 privates wounded. 48 Saxon and Polish artillery pieces were captured by the Swedes. The Saxon artillerymen had sustained 70 men killed, 39 wounded and two officers captured. According to other calculations, four Saxon cavalry regiments and five Saxon infantry regiments had a total loss of 1,406 men, divided between 475 killed, 418 wounded and 513 missing. About 1,700 men were captured, of which 1,100 were unharmed. The Swedes also seized August II's war chest, the Russian envoy's chests to the value of 12,000 riksdaler, 60 standards and banners, and several ammunition stores and tents. Among the most precious spoils of war was a large Turkish tent that August II's father John George III had captured from the Ottomans at the battle of Vienna in 1683.

Aftermath

Thanks to Schulenburg's actions in the final stages of the battle, Augustus II was able to retreat with the majority of his troops. However, his infantry was almost broken and he lost his respect among the Poles, which undermined Polish unity within the Commonwealth. Following the battle, cardinal Radziejowski urged Lubomirski to no longer fight against the Swedes. The Swedes failed to pursue the Saxon–Polish army and their victory was not decisive, since Augustus II was able to retreat to Kraków, where he rallied fresh reinforcements and then continued through eastern Poland towards Sandomierz. For Charles XII, the victory at Kliszów gave him increased operational freedom of movement within Poland, allowing him to use the weakened state of the Commonwealth to his own benefit.

With duke Frederick IV's death, his son Charles Frederick was proclaimed the new duke of Holstein-Gottorp, under the guardianship of his mother Hedvig Sophia and Frederick's brother Christian August. The duke's body was embalmed and escorted on 27 August to Gottorf Castle by Georg Heinrich von Görtz. Among Görtz's escort were several wounded and disabled Swedish soldiers, each of whom was awarded 20 riksdaler to travel back to Sweden.

On 10 July, Charles XII ordered major Creutz to take Pińczów with 100 dragoons and cavalry, where the king established a field hospital for all wounded Swedes and Saxon prisoners of war. The rest of the army arrived there in the following days and encamped near the banks of the Nida. The king gave a decree that every Saxon prisoner who is unharmed should be enlisted in the Swedish service. 900 of these were awarded two months' of salary in advance and were sent for garrison duty in Swedish Pomerania. These, however, mutinied near the border to Silesia and dispersed, several of whom returned to serve Augustus II. Charles XII later ordered lieutenant colonel von Feilitzen to form a garrison in Pińczów, to guard all the wounded and sick, and to collect supplies from the surrounding area. Meanwhile, the king and the rest of the army marched to Skalbmierz. On July 29, he conquered Kraków and established his headquarters there. During the following weeks in Kraków, Charles XII made fruitless peace talks with Augustus II and collected contributions for the maintenance of the main army. On the arrival of Gyllenstierna's troops, Charles XII was able to march into Lublin on early October, where he took up winter quarters with an army of 23,000 men.

See also
Swedish invasion of Poland (1701–1706)
Swedish invasion of Saxony
Campaign of Grodno
Civil war in Poland (1704–1706)

Notes

Sources

References

Bibliography

 
 
 
 
 
 
 
 
 
 
 
  
 
 
 
 
 
 
 

 

Conflicts in 1702
Kliszow 1702
Kliszow 1702
Kliszow 1702
Kliszow 1702
History of Świętokrzyskie Voivodeship
1702 in the Polish–Lithuanian Commonwealth